The Gaudí Centre is a museum located in Reus, Catalonia, Spain. It is dedicated to Spanish architect Antoni Gaudí I Cornet.

The Gaudí Center officially opened in May 2007, located in the center of the city, Plaça del Mercadal. It is a three-storied building designed by architects Joan Sibina, Toshiake Tange and Gabriel Bosques, which consists of Gaudí's artworks and documenting processes with advanced audio and visual technology.

History
The center opened in May 2007 as a modern and interactive museum. It is located in Plaça del Mercadal, the center of the city, which is also on the market square in Reus that linked to Reus Town Council, Patronat de Turisme, and the Modernist buildings Casa Navàs and Casa Pinyol. The locals have known the center as "Gaudí Casket", which is dedicated to Antonio Gaudí, "the city's beloved son". The interpretation center exhibits works related to his life and a few surviving handwritten notebooks, including the original copy with English translations and duplication of his models, major works, and studio.

Architecture and design
The museum is a three-story building that has 1,200 m2 exhibition space throughout the three floors. It is also known as the entry doors to the city.

The city council has invested 10,000 euros on small interventions on the facade by changing the fluorescent and indicative vinyl. Its LED system saves 70% of electrical consumption.

Management
The center offers a tour guide service to the Modernist Route of Reus, Institut Pere Mata, Casa Navàs, and back to the Gaudí Centre. It also has a temporary exhibition hall, a gift shop, and a restaurant. Its advanced audio and visual technology is the key to the museum. It also provides audio guides in different languages. The center intends to attract children and young adults, allowing visitors to experience through their senses to explore Gaudí's art pieces. The museum contains different objects from Antoni Gaudí, as well as multimedia about his designs throughout the three floors. The first floor, "Gaudí and Reus", displays his drafts and documents and information related to Antonio Gaudí's place of birth. The second floor, "Gaudí- innovator", exhibits Gaudí's inspirations and ideas in art expressed by two-way models and materials. The third floor, "Antonio Gaudí and the Universe", displays an audiovisual show with a film called, "Invitation to the world of Gaudí", and models of important works that made Gaudí famous and unique.

Admission
The Gaudí Center charges adults for 9 euros, students for 5 euros, and free of charge for eight years old or under. The opening hours on Sunday are from 11 A.M. to 2 P.M. and from Monday to Saturday is from 10 A.M. to 7 P.M.

See also
Modernisme

References

External links
Official website 

Antoni Gaudí
Museums in Catalonia
Buildings and structures in Reus
Biographical museums in Spain
Design museums
Museums devoted to one artist